is a 2003 video game developed by Racjin and published by Hudson Soft that was released in July for the PlayStation 2 and GameCube. Part of the Bomberman franchise, it is the sequel and the second game in the Bomberman Land series.

Plot
One day, Bombermen were invited to the newly opened Bomberman Land theme park by the park manager. The player's goal is to collect 125 BOMPAD pieces obtained through the adventures inside the park.

Gameplay
In addition to mini-games within the main story, there are other mini-games:

Survival Bomberman - An action role-playing game 
Bomberman Kart - A subset of the Bomberman Kart video game
Bomberman Battle - The multiplayer blasting action featured in most Bomberman titles. New game modes include Star battle mode, point battle mode
SameGame - Bomberman-themed SameGame
Panic Bomber - A variant of Super Bomberman Panic Bomber World. Up to 4 people can play at the same time

When connecting a Game Boy Advance to the GameCube version of the game, 10 mini-games can be downloaded and played on the Game Boy Advance.

Promotion

To celebrate Bomberman Land 2s release, Hudson Soft scheduled Bomberman Land 2 competitions at five retail locations in Japan.

Reception
The game received a score of 27/40 from Famitsu.

References

External links
 

2003 video games
Land 2
GameCube games
Japan-exclusive video games
PlayStation 2 games
Racjin games
Multiplayer and single-player video games
Video games developed in Japan
Video games set in amusement parks

Hudson Soft games